Kerreen M. Reiger (born 1946) is an Australian academic, sociologist and author. She lives in Melbourne and teaches sociology at La Trobe University.  She has a special interest in family, motherhood and childbirth and was one of the founders of the activist group Maternity Coalition.

Bibliography
 Our Bodies, Our Babies - the forgotten women's movement, Kerreen Reiger, Melbourne University Press, Melbourne, 2001 
 Family Economy'''
 Disenchantment of the Home - Modernizing the Australian Family''

References

External links
 

1946 births
Living people
Australian sociologists
Australian women sociologists
Australian women writers
Australian non-fiction writers